Thomas A. Kolditz (born July 23, 1956) is an American retired Brigadier General, an educator, author, and consultant.

Military

Kolditz led the Department of Behavioral Sciences and Leadership at the U.S. Military Academy West Point for 12 years, where he was responsible for teaching, research, and outreach activities in Management, Leader Development Science, Psychology, and Sociology. General Kolditz has more than 26 years in leadership roles and 34 years of military service. He was also the founding director of the West Point Leadership Center. General Kolditz has been a skydiving instructor since 1980 and served for 10 years as the senior instructor for the West Point Sport Parachute Team.

Academic

Kolditz is a Fellow in the American Psychological Association. In 2007, while still on active duty, Tom was appointed a Visiting Professor at the Yale School of Management  Leader Development Program and taught a crisis leadership course in their MBA curriculum. Later, he became the Director of the Leader Development Program at the Yale School of Management. Kolditz is also the founding Director of the Doerr Institute for New Leaders at Rice University.

Consultancy

His first book, In Extremis Leadership: Leading as if Your Life Depended on It, published in 2007, is based on more than 175 interviews taken on the ground in Iraq during combat operations.  His second book, Leadership Reckoning: Can Higher Education Develop the Leaders We Need, announced a reform movement for leader development in higher education. Kolditz is also a keynote speaker.

References

External links 
 Thomas Kolditz Keynote Speaking Biography

United States Army generals
1956 births
Living people